Wisconsin International University College, Ghana is one of the earliest established private universities in Ghana. It is located at Agbogba Junction near Kwabenya in the Greater Accra Region of Ghana. It was established in January 2000 and is accredited by the National Accreditation Board as a university college and affiliated to the University of Ghana, University of Cape Coast, the Kwame Nkrumah University of Science and Technology and University for Development Studies.

History 
In 1992, Wisconsin International University was established. The first campus was established in Tallinn, Estonia and was called: Concordia International University Estonia. In 1997, Wisconsin International University Ukraine was founded in Kyiv.

Campuses 
There are currently three campuses:

 Accra Campus at Agbogba, North Legon
Kanda (City Campus, Greater Accra Region)
 Kumasi Campus at Feyiase - Atonsu - Lake Road

Organization
There are currently Five Schools and two faculties

Programs 

 Undergraduate 
 Postgraduate 
 Certificate (Short Courses)

Undergraduate Program

Wisconsin Business School 
Department of General Business Studies

BA Business Studies, General Business

Department of Management Studies

BA Business Studies, Human Resource Management
BA Business Studies, Marketing

Department of Accounting, Finance and Banking

BA Business Studies, Banking and Finance
BA Business Studies, Accounting
BSc. Accounting

School of Computing Technology
Department of Business Computing

BA Computer Science and Management
BSc. Management and Computer Studies

Department of Information Technology

BSc. Information Technology
Diploma - Information Technology

School of Nursing
Department of Nursing

 BSc Nursing
 BSc Midwifery
 BSc Community Health Nursing

School of Communication

 BA Communication Studies - Specializations in Journalism (Broadcast, Print and Online)

Faculty of Law

Bachelor of Laws (LL.B)

Faculty of Humanities and Social Sciences
Department of Language, Arts and Communication Studies

Department of Social Sciences

BA Development and Environmental Studies
BSc. Economics

Postgraduate Program: School of Research and Graduate Studies 

 MA Adult Education - Options in Rural and Community Development/Human Resource Development
 MBA -  Options in Finance/ Project Management/ Human Resource Management/ Marketing/ Accounting/ Management Information Systems
 MSc - Environmental Sustainability and Management

Certificate/Short Courses 

 Professional Diploma in Functional and Advanced Investigations
Diploma in Information Technology
Certificate in Paralegal Studies
Executive Certificate in Security Management, Forensics and Investigative Management
Advanced Executive Certificate in Security Management, Forensics and Investigative Management
Certificate in Music
Certificate in Sign Language
Certificate in Occupational Health and Safety Management
Certificate in Christian Formation Leadership.

Library 
The University currently has the following libraries:

 Main Campus Library
 Faculty of Law Library
 Nursing Library
 Kumasi Campus Library
 City Campus Library.

Affiliations
 Wisconsin International University Homepage
University of Cape Coast, Cape Coast
University of Ghana
Kwame Nkrumah University of Science and Technology
University for Development Studies

Nationalities at Wisconsin 
Currently the institution can boast of students of over 30 nationalities and speaking 20 languages from across Africa, Asia and America.

See also
List of universities in Ghana

Notes

External links
National Accreditation Board
Wisconsin International University College

Universities in Ghana
Educational institutions established in 2000
Education in Accra
2000 establishments in Ghana